Gebesee is a town in the district of Sömmerda, in Thuringia, Germany. It is situated near the confluence of the rivers Gera and Unstrut, 18 km northwest of Erfurt.

References

Sömmerda (district)